This is a list of Sri Lankan Moors. Sri Lankan Moors (formerly Ceylon Moors; colloquially referred to as Muslims or Moors) are the minority ethnic group in Sri Lanka, comprising 9.3% of the country's total population. They are mainly native speakers of the Tamil language with influence of Sinhalese and Arabic words, however, some of them use Sinhalese as their native tongue. They are predominantly followers of Islam.

The Moors trace their ancestry to Arab traders who settled in Sri Lanka in waves beginning from the 8th century. The population of Moors are the highest in the Ampara, Trincomalee and Batticaloa districts.

The Portuguese named the Muslims in India and Sri Lanka after the Muslim Moors they met in Iberia. The word Moors did not exist in Sri Lanka before the arrival of the Portuguese colonists. The term 'Moor' was chosen because of the Islamic faith of these people, and was not a reflection of their origin.

The Tamil term for Moors is Sonakar, which is thought to be derived from the word sunni. The Tamil term Sonakar along with the Sinhalese term Yonaka, has been thought to have been derived from the term Yona, a term originally applied to Greeks, but sometimes also Arabs.

Demographics

Sri Lankan Moor    Population and Percentage

Pioneers
Yusuf bin Ahmad al-Kawneyn – Arab traveller said to have founded Beruwala
One tradition names a Prince Jamal-ud-din, son of Sultan Alaa-uddin of Konya, Turkey, to have arrived in Beruwala in the 10th century and introduced the Unani medicine system to the island.
Another tradition states that four vessels sailed from Yemen with three Sultans, Bad-ur-din, Salah-ud-din and Mohamed. They landed at Mannar and settled there. Sad-ur-din, the son of Mohamed, sailed further south along the West coast and settled in Beruwela.
Tradition states that during the reign of a certain "Raja Sinha", three Arabs travelled inland to Kandy. The king allowed them to take three native wives, and the three Arabs settled Akurana. Those three Arabs became the ancestors of the Moors of Akurana.

Native Headmen of Ceylon
Native Headmen System was an integral part of the administration of the island of Ceylon (now known as Sri Lanka) under the successive European colonial powers, namely the Portuguese Empire, the Dutch East India Company and the British Empire. Native headmen or leaders were appointed by the European colonial administrators to function as intermediates between the Europeans and the native populous. During different periods through this system these headmen functioned in military, policing, administrative and ceremonial capacities. They served as translators, revenue collectors and wielded quasi-judicial powers. Much of the system evolved and changed over time until some of the last vestiges of it were removed in the post-independent Ceylon.

With the on set of British rule, Governor North restructured the native headmen system. The system was transformed into a salaried system with land grants and tenured service abolished. They became the second tier of the civil administration of the island with appointments made by the Government Agent of the Province. Appointments were non-transferable and usually hereditary, made to locals, usually from wealthy influential families loyal the British Crown. The holder had much control over the people of the area and had limited police powers since he was responsible to keep the peace, carry out revenue collection and assist in judicial functions. Over the next century, the headmen grew to be a powerful and affluent class consolidating economic power through land ownership and marriage. Gradually functions of headmen were transferred to various departments that were established by the British administration.

Following the formation of the State Council of Ceylon in 1931, one of its members, H. W. Amarasuriya, called for an inquiry into the Native Headman System. A commission was formed made up of retired civil servants and lawyers headed by H.M. Wedderburn. The commission reported on reforming the headman system or replacing it with transferable District Revenue Officers. The Native Headman System was abolished as an administrative system, with the titles of Mudaliyar (Mudali – මුදලි) and Muhandiram retained by government to be awarded as honors. This practice remained until suspension of Celanese honors in 1956. The minor headman positions were retained, surviving well into the 1970s when the posts of Vidane (විදානේ) in Low Country / Tamil Area and Town Arachchi (ටවුන් ආරච්චි) / Gan Arachchi (ගන් ආරච්චි) in Kandyan Area were replaced with the transferable post of Grama Niladhari (Village Officer).

“Peace Officer” includes Police Officer and the Headman of an area appointed in writing to perform police duties by the Government Agent of the Province by virtue of the powers vested in him by His Excellency the Governor.

List of Prominent Headmen in the Low Country
The headmen system in the coastal and low country, evolved over time under the colonial administration of the Portuguese, the Dutch and then the British.

Head Mudaliyar Maha Mudaliyar (මහ මුදලි)
Head Mudaliyar was the head of the low country native headmen and native aide-de-camp to the Governor of Ceylon.
 Chief Mudaliyar Sheikh Abdul Cader Marikar Muhammad Cassim Lebbe Marikar (1805–1877) – Chief Mudaliyar Eastern Province

Korale Mudaliyar (Korale Mudali – කෝරලේ මුදලි)
Korale Mudaliyar was in-charge of an area known as a Korale and had several Muhandiram's under his supervision

Muhandiram (මුහන්දිරම්) 
A Muhandiram had several Vidane Arachchies under his supervision
 Haji Marikkar Muhandiram (d:1817) of Wellassa
 Galagaha Vidanalagegedara Seyed Mohamed Lebbe Marikar Madige Muhandiram (1840–1939) of Kandy
 M. K. Abdul Hameed Madige Muhandiram of Kurunegala
 Mohammed Salie Muhandiram Madige Aarachchi of Kotiyakumbura 
 Ibra Lebbe Sulaiman Lebbe Muhandiram (1893–1964) of Kurikotuwa Maddeketiya Korale
 Muhandiram M. K. Mahmood Lebbe a.k.a Thalama (1910–1981) of Ibbagamuwa.

Vidane Arachchi (විදානේ ආරච්චි)
A Vidane Arachchi had several Vidanes under his supervision
 Muhammedh Thamby Samsudheen Vidane Arachchi a.k.a Dheen Arachchi (1860–1915) of Negombo – Dheen Junction in Negombo is named after him
 Ali Thambi Abbas Lebbe Vidane Arachchi of Kal-Eliya 
 I. L. M.  Usuph Vidane Arachchi of Hanmbantota

Vidane (විදානේ) 
A village or a group of small villages placed under his administration. Vidane was a Low Country headman ranking immediately below that of a Vidane Arachchi in Low Country and below that of a Udayar in Tamil Area in the Native Headmen System. A Vidane was equivalent in ranking to the Kandyan Areas headmen Town Arachchi or a Gan Arachchi

Vidane
 Arrasi Marikkar a.k.a Sinna Thamby Vidane of Malwana
 Muhammad Hajie Marikar Vidane of Alutgama
 Maththicham Saleem Lebbe Muhammed Thamby Vidane (1819-1879) of Negombo – Udayar Thoppuwa Mosque at Dheen Junction in Negombo was built by him in 1846. This Masjid is maintained by his descendants who continue to preserve the original building.
 Avoo Lebbe Marikar Vidane (1836–1906) of Thihariya

Police Vidane
in charge of police duties in the Village under the supervision of the vidane
 Hassan Meera Lebbe Police Vidane of Kahatovita

Vel Vidane
In charge of distributing water from the wewa (tank) to villagers for cultivation under the supervision of the vidane

Seeni Vidane
In charge of distributing Sugar under the supervision of the vidane

List of Prominent Headmen in Tamil Areas
The Northern and Eastern provinces had the following classes of native headmen:

Atikar

Vanniyar (වන්නියා) (பண்டாரத்தார்)
Vanniar or Vanniyar had several Maniyagar under his supervision.
 Abdul Kareem Kariapper Vanniah of Eravur Pattu and Koralai Pattu 
 Abdul Latheef Kariapper Vanniah of Sammanthurai Pattu 
 M. M. Abdul Majeed Vanniah of Kalmunaikudy
 Meera Lebbe Podi Vanniah of  Karaivahu

Maniyagar
Maniyagar had several Udayar's under his supervision

Udayar
Udayar had several Vidane's under his supervision
 Mohamed Saleem Kariapper Udayar a.k.a Salin Udayar of Eravur

Vidane

Vidane
A village or a group of small villages placed under his administration. Vidane was a Low Country headman ranking immediately below that of a Vidane Arachchi in Low Country and below that of a Udayar in Tamil Area in the Native Headmen System. A Vidane was equivalent in ranking to the Kandyan Areas headmen Town Arachchi or a Gan Arachchi
 Mohammed Mohideen Kariapper Vidane of  Karaivahu

Police Vidane
in charge of police duties in the Village under the supervision of the vidane

Vel Vidane
In charge of distributing water from the wewa (tank) to villagers for cultivation under the supervision of the vidane

Seeni Vidane
In charge of distributing Sugar under the supervision of the vidane
 Mohammed Meera Lebbe Seeni Vidane of Kalmunaikudy

List of Prominent Headmen in the Kandyan Areas
Following the Uva Rebellion in 1818 and changes to the administrative divisions of the island with the creation of Districts, British Government Agents (GA) took over the duties of the Dissava (with the remaining and newly appointed Dissavas being mere honorary titles), with Rate Mahatmaya becoming a subordinate to the local Government Agents and Assistant Government Agents. In the same way, after 1818 the position of the remaining and newly appointed Adigar (Maha Adigar or 1st Adigar) became mere honorary titles.

Adigar
An honorary appointment

Dissava
British Government Agent of the Province took over the duties of a  Dissava (with the remaining and newly appointed Dissavas being mere honorary appointments) in 1818. Rate Mahatmayas under his supervision

Rate Mahatmaya (රටෙි මහත්තයා) 
Rate Mahatmaya had several Korale Mahatmayas under his supervision.

Korale Mahaththaya (කෝරලේ මහත්තයා) 
Korale Mahattaya was in-charge of an area known as Korale and had several Gran Arachchis / Town Arachchis under his supervision.

Town Arachchi (ටවුන් ආරච්චි)
A Town Arachchi had a Town or group of small villages placed under his Administration
 Samsudeen Town Arachchi (1892-1956) of Danowita
 Unus Ibunu Muhammed Abdul Razzak Town Arachchi (1895–1972) of Nelundeniya
 Ahamed Lebbe Muhammed Junaid Town Arachchi (1914-1995) of Thulhiriya

Gan Arachchi (ගන් ආරච්චි)
A Gan Arachchi had a village or group of small villages placed under his Administration
 Meerakkandu Muhandiramala Abdul Rahiman Lebbe Gan Arachchi of Udatalawinna
 Dambagolle Vidanele Omerudeen Lebbe Gan Arachchi of Udatalawinna
 Galagaha Vidanalage Gedara Ismail Marikkar Grama Aarachchi of Mawanella 
 Galagawa Vidanele Seyado Mabammado Lebbe Gan Arachchi Madawalamadige

List of Prominent Headmen Peace Officers
“Peace Officer” includes police officers and headmen appointed by a Government Agent in writing to perform police duties.

 Peace Officer Muhammad Ghany of Galloluwa
 Peace Officer Sidar Muhannad Ali Thamby of Kal-Eliya
 Peace Officer Iburahim Lebbe of Illawatura
 Peace Officer Ahamadu Lebbe Mohammadu Lebbe Markan of Kadiyawatta
 Peace Officer Khalid Ahamed Unus Ibunu (1845–1905) of Nelundeniya
 Peace Officer Unus Ibunu Muhammed Ismail (1873–1918) of Warakapola
 Peace Officer Ali of Polgahawela

List of Prominent Head Moorman

Head Moorman Appointments made prior to 1824
 Dr. Oduma Lebbe Marikar Sheikh Abdul Cader Marikar alias Shaikady Marikar (1772–1847) – Head Moorman of Colombo 
 Cader Shahib Marikar – Kariapper, or Head Moorman over the Temple at Welasse
 Neina Marikar, – Head Marikar of the Moormen in the jurisdiction of Tricomalie
 Cader Sahib Marikar – Head Moorman under the collector of Galle
 Slema Lebbe Samsy Lebbe –  Head Moomen of Gindura
 Sekadi Marikar Sekadi Lebbe Marikar – Head Moomman of Matara
 Kasi Lebbe Sinne Lebbe Marikar – Head Moorman of Weligama
 Omer Marikar Sego Lebbe Marikar – Head Moorman under the Collectors of Chilaw
 Neina Lebbe Bawa Marikar – Head Moorman of Puttalam
  Sinna Tamby – Head Moorman of Kalpentyn

Head Moorman Appointments made after 1824
 Muhammad Lebbe Siddi Lebbe  – Head Moorman of Kandy. Appointed in 1833

Awarded as an Honor (Titular)

List of Prominent Gate Mudaliyar
 Gate Mudaliyar Casie Lebbe Maestriyar Oduma Lebbe of Kandy 
 Gate Mudaliyar Ahamath Ibrahim Jainu-Deen (1864-1924) of Badulla 
 Gate Aboobucker Mudaliyar of Galle 
 Gate Mudaliyar Muhammad Ismail Abdul Rahman of Colombo

List of Prominent Gate Muhandiram

List of Prominent Moor Gate Arachchi
Pawalkodi Ismail Lebbe Marikar Mathicham Muhammad Abdullah Headman, Titular Arachchi of Matara

List of Prominent Veda Arachchi

Leading Businesspersons

During British Ceylon

1796 to 1814

1815-1832
 Oduma Lebbe Marikar Ahmed Lebbe Marikar Alim (OLMALM Alim) d. 1917  – He established O.L.M.A.L.M. Alim & Sons (Import of hardware & household items) in 1820 at 3rd Cross Street, Colombo 11.  He was one of the wealthy among the Ceylon Moors in Colombo. He did extensive hardware business and was possessed of several immovable properties. He had several sons who managed each department of his businesses. He died in 1917 and his estate was valued at approximately two million rupees.

1833-1930
 Idroos Lebbe Marikar Noordeen Hajiar – He established I.L.M. Noordeen Hajiar & Company (Import of iron, steel, metal, hardware, small arms, ammunition & electrical good) in 1840 at 236 Main Street, Colombo 11
 S.M. Assena Marikar – He established S.M. Assena Marikar & Company (Import of hardware & household items) in 1840 at 6 &14 China Street, Colombo 11.
 Yusuf Lebbe Idroos Lebbe Marikar Hajiar – He was General Merchant and Landed Proprietor. He was the Trustee of the Grand Mosque and had donated a valuable property in Pettah for the Mosque. 
 Arasi Marikar Wapchie Marikar (1829–1925) –  His name will be long remembered as the builder of the General Post Office in Colombo, the Colombo Museum, Colombo Customs, Old Town Hall in Pettah, the Galle Face Hotel, Victoria Arcade, Finlay Moir building, the Clock Tower, Batternburg Battery etc. In January 1877, the completed building of the Colombo Museum was declared open by His Excellency, Governor Gregory, in the presence of a large crowd, amongst which there were many Muslims present. At the end of the ceremony His Excellency asked Arasi Marikar Wapchi Marikar what honour he wished to have for his dedication. The same question was asked by His Excellency from the carpenter who assisted Wapchi Marikar with the wood work of the Museum who desired a local Rank and was honoured accordingly. Wapchi Marikar, noticing the large number of Muslims present, feared that they would spend their time at the Museum on Friday during the Islamic congregation prayer, and requested that the Museum be closed on Fridays. This request has been adhered to by all authorities in charge of the Museum to this day.
 M.C. Joonoos – He established M.C. Joonoos & Company (Export of Jewelry & Gems) in 1855 at 12 Grand Orient Hotel, Colombo 01
 O.L.M. Macan-Markar (d. 1901)  – He established O.L.M. Macan-Markar & Company (Export of Jewellery & Gems) in 1860 at Grand Orient Hotel, Galle Face Hotel, Hotel Taprobane, Galle Face Courts Colombo 03
 Cassim Lebbe Marikkar Bawa – He Established C.L. Marikar Bawa & Sons (Import of Diamonds & Silk, Export of Jewelry & Gems) in 1869 at 90 Chatham Street, Colombo 01. Bawa Place in Colombo 08 is named after him 
 Ismail Lebbe Marikar Muhammad Cassim – He established Abdul Rahims (Import of household items, hardware, furniture & electrical goods) in 1872 in the name of his eldest son Muhammad Cassim Abdul Rahim
 Assen Ali Muhammad Nagoor Meera – He established AM Nagoor Meera & Company in 1886 at Gas Works Street, Colombo 11. He died in 1923 and left behind an estate valued at 21 million Rupees, a vast and unbelievable fortune at that time 
 A.H. Hamid – He established A.H. Hamid & Company (Import of Diamonds, Export of Pearls, Jewelry & Gems) in 1886 at 9/10 Bristol Building, Colombo 01
 Abdul Latife – He established Abdul Latife & Company (Import of household items) in 1887 at 23/25 3rd Cross Street, Colombo 11
 Sulaiman Lebbe Naina Marikar Hajiar (1868–1926) – He established S.L. Naina-Marikar & Company [Import of textiles & automobiles (1920)] at 188 Keyzer Street, Colombo 11
 Noordeen Hajiar Abdul Gaffoor Hajiar – He established N. D. H. Abdul Gaffoor & Sons (Export of Gems, Pearls, & Jewelry, Import of Diamonds) in 1895 at Gaffoor Building, Bristol Street, Colombo. He had special permission to board the ships that called at the Colombo harbour and sell his gems and jewellery to the sailors. By special command, Abdul Gaffoor was allowed the privilege of exhibiting pearls, diamonds, rubies and sapphires and art works to the Prince and Princess of Wales at the Kandy Pavilion, during their Royal visit in 1901. His stall was given a prominent place at the Wembley Exhibition in 1924 and Her Majesty Queen Mary personally visited his pavilion and made purchases. It was by sheer merit that he achieved success. In 1932, he established a Muslim Theological Institute, known as the Ghaffooria Arabic College, for the study of Arabic, at Maharagama. Abdul Caffoor Mawatha in Colombo 03 is named after him
 Wapu Marikar Hassim JP (1880–1960) – He attended Wesley College, Colombo, and was preparing to appear for the Notary's examination when his elders recommended that he take up to trade and business. He established W. M. Hassim & Sons (Import of hardware & household items) in 1906, at No. 77, Main Street, Colombo 11. His charity knew no bounds for both Muslim and non-Muslim causes. The state, acknowledging his philanthropy and educational activity, honored him with the title of Justice of the Peace on the occasion of the 25th Anniversary of the accession to the throne of His majesty King George V
 Levana Marikar Uvais Hajiar – He established Mackie Stores in 1921 at 256 Main Street Colombo 11

1931-1947
 A.M.M Rajabdeen - He established A.M.M Rajabdeen & Sons in 1935 (Importers of Sanitaryware, Ceramic, Bathroom Fittings & Accessories, Tiles, P.V.C, Pipes and Hardware) in 1960 at 125 Messenger Street Colombo 12, Rajabdeen & Sons Currently it is run by their grandson ( or Great Grandson) Adnan Rajabdeen and is located at 192 Nawala Road, Narahenpita, Colombo 05
 S. M. M. Hussain (1916–1991) – He established The Colombo Picture Palace (picture framing and sheet glass) in 1942

During Dominion of Ceylon

1948–1971
 M.I.M. Mohideen– He established M.I.M. Mohideen & Company (Importersof Sanitaryware, Ceramic, Bathroom Fittings & Accessories, Tiles, P.V.C, Pipes and Hardware) in 1960 at 110, 114 Messenger Street Colombo 12
 A.W.M. Makeen Hajiar (1933–2014) – He established Macksons Holdings (parent Company of Multilac Paints) in 1970
 M.L.M Naeem Hajiar – He established Ali Brothers in 1970

Republic of Sri Lanka

1972-1977
 Mohamed Ismail Mohamed Naleem Hajiar (1932–2006) – Gem Merchant, Founder of Bairaha Group in 1975.
 Mohamed Haniffa Abdul Razzak Hajiar- He established Asian Hardware in 1975, current head office at No.144, Messenger Street, Colombo 12
 Zainul Abdeen Marikar Mohamed Refai Hajiar – He established Zam Gems in 1976

1978 to present
 N.L.M. Mubarack –  He established the leading fashion retail chain French Corner in 1992 which was rebranded in 2005 as NOLIMIT
 Rizwi Thahar – He established the leading fashion retail chain Cool Planet in 2006

Politicians

During British Ceylon

Legislative Council of Ceylon (1833–1931)

 Muhammad Cassim Abdul Rahman (1829–1899) – He was nominated to a seat in the Colombo Municipal Council in 1876 to look after and promote the interest of the local Ceylon Moors (Muslims). He made such an impressive mark, that, while a Counsellor he was also appointed as an unofficial Municipal Magistrate. The Moors of Ceylon of the time, incoherent though, yet made calls for representation in the Legislative Council to which Abdul Rahman was appointed on October 29, 1889, as the first Mohammedan member, by Governor Gordon. His indispensability received such recognition, that, at the end of his five-year term, he was re-appointed for a further five years by Governor Havelock. However, he did not live long enough to fulfil that extended term.
 Wapchie Marikar Abdul Rahman (1868–1933) – He was nominated to the Legislative Council as the Muslim member in 1900
 Proctor Noordeen Hajiar Muhammad Abdul Cader (1879–1938) – He was one of the leading proctors of the day. He succeeded W.M.Abdul Rahman as the Muslim Member of the Legislative Council in 1915 and represented the Muslims in the Legislative Council for fifteen years.

State Council of Ceylon (1931–1947)
 Sir Mohamed Macan Markar (7 September 1877 – 10 May 1952) was a Sri Lankan, prominent colonial era legislator and businessmen. He was Minister of Home Affaires of the State Council, member of the Legislative Council and Senator
 Sir Razik Fareed OBE, JP, UM (29 December 1893  – 23 August 1984), was a Ceylonese (Sri Lankan) landed proprietor, politician, diplomat and philanthropist. He was the former Cabinet Minister of Trade, Senator, member of parliament and the state council. He had also served as Ceylon's High Commissioner to Pakistan.

During Dominion Ceylon

House of Representatives (Ceylon) (1947–1972)
 Proctor Hameed Hussain Sheikh Ismail (19 May 1901 – 3 August 1974) – He was the 5th (First Muslim) Speaker of the Parliament of Sri Lanka (19 April 1956 – 5 December 1959). and first elected Member of Parliament in the first general election held for the Parliament of Independent Ceylon in 1947. Founder of Ceylon Baithul Mal Fund
  Mudaliyar Ahamedlebbe Sinnalebbe (b 1902)  – At the time of gaining political freedom the question of the national flag became an issue among the political leaders of the day. On Friday January 16, 1948 when the parliament met after lunch A. Sinnalebbe (Batticaloa) rose in parliament and moved, "That this house is of opinion that the Royal Standards of King Sri Wickrama Raja Sinha depicting a yellow lion passant holding a sword in its right paw on a red background, which was removed to England after the Convention of 1815, should once again be adopted as the official flag of free Lanka."
 Gate Mudaliyar M. S. Kariapper (1899– 1989) – He was a Sri Lankan politician and Member of Parliament. He was elected to Parliament at the 1947 parliamentary election to represent Kalmunai, as a United National Party candidate.
 C.A.S. Marikkar (5 July 1911 –18 Nov 1970 ) founder member of SLFP. Minister for Post, Broadcasting and Communication during the 1956 cabinet. Member of Parliament from 1952 to 1960.
 Proctor M. M. Musthapa (1924–2000) – Minister of Fiancé from 22 November 1959 to 5 December 1959 
 Proctor I. A. Cader (1917–1979) – Ibrahim Adaham Abdul Cader, known as I. A. Cader was the Deputy Speaker of the Parliament of Sri Lanka (22 May 1970 – 18 May 1977)

Republic of Sri Lanka

National State Assembly of Sri Lanka (1972–1978)
 Dr Badi-ud-din Mahmud (23 June 1904 – 16 June 1997)  – He was a Sri Lankan politician. He served 10 years [(23 July 1960 – 28 May 1963) and (31 May 1970 – 23 July 1977)] as Minister of Education and also held the office of Minister of Health and Housing.

Parliament of Sri Lanka (1978–present)
 Deshamanya Abdul Bakeer Markar – (12 May 1917 – 10 September 1997) was a Sri Lankan politician. He was the 12th (second Muslim) Speaker of the Parliament of Sri Lanka (21 September 1978 – 30 August 1983) and Governor of the Southern Province.
 A. C. S. Hameed (10 April 1927 – 3 September 1999) – He served as Minister of Foreign Affairs of Sri Lanka from 1977 to 1989; and from 1993 to 1994. In the intervening period he was Minister of Justice & Higher Education of Sri Lanka.
 M. H. Mohamed (15 June 1921 – 26 April 2016) – was a Sri Lankan politician. Mohamed served as the 14th (Third Muslim) Speaker of the Parliament of Sri Lanka (9 March 1989 – 24 June 1994) as well as being a former member of Parliament and government minister. Mohamed was the first Muslim and Sri Lankan Moor to hold office as Mayor of Colombo
 M. H. M. Naina Marikar – He was the minister of Finance from 10 January 1988 to 3 January 1989
 Imthiaz Bakeer Markar – is a Sri Lankan politician. He is the current Chairman of the National Media Centre and former Cabinet Minister of Media, Postal and Telecommunications  from 2001 to 2004 and State Minister of Housing from 1989 to 1993. He was also a member of the parliament from the Kalutara District from 1989 to 2004. Bakeer Markar is a former Vice President of the United National Party (UNP).
 M. H. M. Ashraff – Leader of the Sri Lanka Muslim Congress (SLMC), Minister of Ports Development and Eastern Rehabilitation and Reconstruction
 Rauff Hakeem – Leader of the Sri Lanka Muslim Congress (SLMC), Minister of Justice
 Rishad Bathiudeen – Leader of the All Ceylon Makkal Congress (ACMC), Minister of Resettlement & Disaster Relief Services
 Ali Sabry –  is a Sri Lankan lawyer and a National list M.P of the SLPP party in 2020 parliamentary election.He is the current Foreign Minister (2022–Present) and He previously served as the Minister of Finance (2022) and Minister of Justice (2020–2022).

Diplomats

Career Diplomats 
 Izzeth Hussain – He was the first ever Muslim to join the Ceylon Overseas Service and the first ever Muslim career diplomat to rise to the highest position in the Foreign Service by holding the position of Director General of Foreign Relations in the Ministry of Foreign Affairs in the 1980s. He was also the Ambassador to the Russian Federation and the Commonwealth of Independent States, based in Moscow.
 A.M.J. Sadiq – Sri Lankan Ambassador to The Kingdom of Netherlands

Civil Servants
 A. M. A. Azeez – first Moor civil servant; former GA of Eastern Province (present Amparai); late Zahira College (Colombo) Principal
 Deshamanya Dr. A. M. M. Sahabdeen – Ceylon Civil Service, Founder of the A.M.M. Sahabdeen Foundation, Former Chairman of Sifani Group of Companies, Former Director of National Savings Bank, Visiting Head of Department of Western Philosophy at the Vidyodaya University

Judges & Lawyers

Judges 
 Justice Izadean Mohamed Ismail – He was the 127th [01st Moor (02nd Muslim)] Justices of the Supreme Court of Sri Lanka.  He was appointed on 1 January 1974 and held the office until 18 December 1981
 Justice Abdul Cader – He was the 141st [02nd Moor (03rd Muslim)] Justices of the Supreme Court of Sri Lanka.  He was appointed on 8 December 1982 and held the office until 28 May 1985
 Justice M. Jameel – Supreme Court
 Justice Ameer Ismail – He was appointed as a Justices of the Supreme Court in 1990 and held the office until 1994
Justice Saleem Marsoof PC – He was appointed as a Justices of the Supreme Court in 2005 and held the office until 2014
 Justice S. I. Imam – He was appointed as a Justices of the Supreme Court on 9 January 2009 and held the office until 20 February 2013

Lawyers 
 Proctor Muhammad Cassim Siddi Lebbe (1838–1898) – First Muslim Lawyer in Sri Lanka, and National Hero.
 Advocate Abdul Caffoor Mohamad Ameer QC – He was the 32nd (First Muslim) Attorney General of Ceylon. He was appointed in 1966 and held the office until 1970.
 Advocate Shibly Aziz PC  – He was the 35th [01st Moor (02nd Muslim)] Solicitor General of Sri Lanka appointed in 1992 and held the office until 1992. He was the 37th (Second Muslim) Attorney General of Ceylon appointed in 1995 and held the office until 1996. President of the Bar Association of Sri Lanka

Physicians

Allopathic Medicine 
 Dr Colenda Marikar Muhammad Zubair – First Muslim to qualify as a Doctor
 Dr S.M Jabir – Second Muslim to qualify as a Doctor
 Deshamanya Dr M. C. M. Kaleel (3 February 1900 – 19 October 1994) – He was a Ceylonese physician (Third Muslim to qualify as a Doctor), social worker and politician. 
 Dr A.C.M. Sulaiman – Founder of The Grandpass Maternity & Nursing Home (Sulaiman's Hospital) in 1942
 Deshamanya Professor A. H. Sheriffdeen – A Sri Lankan surgeon, academic and voluntary worker
Vidya Jyothi Professor Rezvi Sheriff – FRCP (Lon), FRCP (Edin), FRACP, FCCP, FSLCGP, FNASSL is a Sri Lankan academic and physician. He is the Director of the Postgraduate Institute of Medicine; Senior Professor of Medicine; Head of the Department of Clinical Medicine at the Faculty of Medicine, University of Colombo. He is also a Consultant Physician and Nephrologist National Hospital Sri Lanka.

Unani Medicine 
 Dr. A. L. M. M. Hameem \

Ayurveda Medicine 
 Dr. M. M. Abdul Azeez – Orthopedic Physician

Siddha Medicine

Homeopathy Medicine 
 Dr. M. Abdul Latif

Accountants
 Alavi Ibrahim Macan-Markar (1919–1998) – Founder of A I Macan Markar & Co (Chartered Accountants). A I Macan Markar & Co (AIMM) was founded in 1946
 Abdul Rahman Muhammed Hathy (d:8 Oct 2002) – Senior Partner – BDO Burah Hathy and Co (Chartered Accountants). Burah Hathy & Co, was established in 1958
 S. M. Sabry (1940–2008) – The 35th (First Muslim) Auditor General of Sri Lanka. He was appointed on 26 January 1993 and held the office until 13 August 2000.
 Reyaz Mihular – He is the Managing Partner of KPMG in Sri Lanka and is a board member of KPMG's Middle East & South Asia (MESA) Regional Cluster

Engineers

Chemical Engineer

Civil Engineer 
 S. Mufees R. Rafeek – Head of Projects Airport & Aviation Services (Sri Lanka) Ltd

Electrical Engineer 
 S. A. C.  M. Zubair

Mechanical Engineer

Electronic and Telecommunication Engineering 
Dr. Mohamed Fazil Mohamed Firdhous  – Senior Lecturer in Information Technology at the University of Moratuwa, Sri Lanka.

Other Professionals
 Rushdi Jabir (1977) – Motivational Speaker, educated at Prince of Wales College and University of Southern Queensland (MBA). As a Muslim, he has spoken/motivated the highest number of military staff (Army, Navy, Air Force, STF and Police) in Sri Lanka.

Military

Sri Lanka Army 
 Major General M. G. Muthalib – Commanding officer, Sri Lanka Electrical and Mechanical Engineers
 Brigadier Azad Izadeen - Director Rehabilitation
 Major Farook Fikri (d 1997) - Muhammed Farook Muhammed Fikiri was killed in Action in Nineteen Ninety Seven (1997).
 Major Usham Subair - Research Officer - Sri Lanka Army.

Sri Lanka Air Force 
 Flying Officer M. J. M. Aathque died in Aircraft Crash on 26 June 1998

Sri Lanka Navy 
 Captain Akram Alavi – Navy Media Spokes Person
 Commander A.S Fazal Mohamed - Former Training Commander of the Trincomalee Naval Academy

Police

Sri Lanka Police 
 Deputy Inspector General of Police (DIG) A. C. A. Gafoor
 Deputy Inspector General of Police (DIG) M.S.M Nizam

Sports

Cricket 
 Mohamed Abdal Hassain " Abu Fuard " (6 December 1936 – 28 July 2012) was a Sri Lankan cricketer who played first-class cricket for Ceylon from 1957 to 1970 and served for many years as a national cricket administrator
 Farveez Maharoof – Sri Lankan cricketer, in the 2004 World Cup in which he captained the Sri Lankan under 19 team
 Naveed Nawaz – Sri Lankan Test and ODI cricketer, former Sri Lanka 'A team captain and coach of Bangladesh Under-19 cricket team that won the 2020 Cricket World Cup.
 Jehan Mubarak – Sri Lankan Test and ODI cricketer.

Rugby Football 
 Inthisham Marikar – The former Trinity rugby ‘Lion’ led the 1996 double champions Kandy outfit. He represented the national sevens and fifteens teams from 1987 to 1992, and later again in 1996 and 1997. He led the national sevens team tour to Italy. Earlier in his career he led the Under-24 team in 1990 when they toured Hong Kong. He took up coaching in 2000 and has been accredited as level 3 coach by the World Rugby in 2018 becoming only the second Sri Lankan to receive that certificate
 Haris Omar – He led Trinity College Kandy in 1995, he also had the privilege of captaining the Sri Lanka Under 19 and Under 21 rugby teams. He led the Kandy Sports Club in 1999, and became the youngest captain. It was the first time that a father and son captained Kandy SC. (Isphan captained in 1975 and the son after 24 years)

Snooker 
 Muhammad Junaid Muhammad Lafir (27 May 1930 – 26 April 1981) was a former World Champion snooker player from Sri Lanka. Lafir became the world champion in billiards in December 1973 World Amateur Billiards Championship by defeating Satish Mohan of India in the finals held in Mumbai. Lafir became the first Sri Lankan to win a billiards world championship. This was also the first time that a Sri Lankan has won a world championship title in any form of sports competition.

Artists
 Mohideen Baig – popular Sri Lankan musician
Aslam Marikar – Stage Writer and Director. Founder of the Sri Theatre Company. 
 Hussain S.Mohamed – First conductor of the Symphony Orchestra of Sri Lanka with its first concert on 13 September 1958, and the repertoire Geminiani's Second Concerto Grosso, Haydn's Symphony no. 92 "Oxford" and Beethoven's Fourth Piano Concerto with Malinee Jayasinghe-Peris as soloist.

See also
 Islam in Sri Lanka
 Sri Lankan Moors
 Sri Lankan Malays
 List of Sri Lankan Malays
 Indian Moors
 Memons in Sri Lanka

References

Moors
 
Moors
Moors